Q8 may refer to:
 Common abbreviation for Kuwait, used due to its phonetic similarity with the country's name
 The Kuwait Petroleum Corporation
 The Audi Q8
 Q8 (New York City bus)
 Quad 8, the Quadraphonic version of Stereo 8
 Q (TV series), 4th series of Spike Milligan's TV comedy sketch show
 Pacific East Asia Cargo Airlines, IATA designator 
 Trans Air Congo, IATA designator
 The quaternion group 
 Quran 8, al-ʾanfāl the 8th chapter of the Islamic Holy book

See also
8Q (disambiguation)